The following is a list of Canadian ambassadors to Burkina Faso. Canada established a diplomatic mission to Burkina Faso in 1962.

Bruce MacGillivray Williams — 1962
Donald Macalister Cornett — 1962–1965
Charles Eustace McGaughey — 1965–1966
Albert Frederick Hart — 1966–1968
Douglas Barcham Hicks — 1968–1969
Wilfrid Joseph Georges Charpentier — 1969–1972
Gilles Mathieu — 1972–1975
Michel de Goumois — 1975–1978
Joseph Ernest Gilles Lalande — 1978–1980
Ernest Hébert — 1980–1983
John Peter Bell — 1983–1988
Jean-Guy Joseph Bernard Saint-Martin — 1988–1991
Jean Denis Belisle — 1991–1994
Suzanne Laporte — 1994–1995
Louise Ouimet — 1995–1997
Jules Savaria — 1997–2001
Denis Briand — 2001–?
Louis-Robert Daigle
Ivan Roberts — 2011–2015
Vincent Le Pape — 2015-October 27, 2017
Edmond R. Dejon Wega — October 27, 2017 present

References

Canada
Burkina Faso